Togo has very diverse and rich traditions in music and dance, which is in part reflected by Togo's regional hip hop scene.
Hip-hop togo is the style of Old school hip hop of America mixing with the traditional music of Togo.

History
Although hip hop was already present in west Africa as early as 1985, it wasn’t until 1990 that the movement reached Togo. Before graffiti, MCing, DJing, and beatboxing, it was breakdance that was first introduced to Togo's capital, Lomé, by Bizzar MC and Wy-Kiki. It became so popular in local clubs that even a school of breakdance was established. Eric MC, who was inspired by his experience with hip hop in Ivory Coast, created a dance group as well.

Togolese hip hop music began with the pioneering group "Black Syndicate", which consisted of O. Below and Y. More from Lomé.  Most Togolese hip hop artists are students from high schools or universities. The world of Togolese hip hop may be narrowed down according to each artist's style of music. Some hip-hop artists seem to have honed the skill of mixing popular songs made up with rapping beats. The most influential and well-known rapper from Togo is Eric MC a.k.a. The Black Man who won the Togo Hip Hop Awards twice with his debut album Adjamofo.

Some Togolese hip hop contains influences from soul music. Such music has beats that are more soft and lyrics that talk about love and hope. As an example, one can site the music of  WEDY, who changed the image of Togolese hip hop.

The first advancement for hip hops recognition in Togo happened in 1992 when MC Solaar performed in concert at the Palais des Congrès de Lomé. Force One Posse, the first official Togolese rap group, performed the opening act along with Eric MC, Wy-Kiki, Sino, Ali-Jezz, MC Creator, and Bad Boy. Eventually, the group released Dagma Vanesa, an album that did not garner public attention because of a lack of financial resources. Other rap groups emerged after the concert, including World Reality.
Hip-hop in Togo in the branch of rap start from the pioneer crew Black Syndicat and Dady creator. In the years 2000 some rappers grow up from differents areas in Lomé, we have Hodada from hope's raw records, immortal Adze in the mouvement in adidowood step;    Orcyno  , Elom 20ce. The rap in Togo kept his position to educate, claim, to set peace in the whole world, that is why most of them are rapping in French, English, and the local languages like Ewe and Kabyè.

Characteristics

Production business 

Producers and studio managers are very expensive because hip hop is not yet well developed in Togo so infrastructures made for the production of hip hop albums are scarce and not all the artists are able to produce their albums. The most important label in the Togolese hip hop production is the Hope Row record, which controls the majority of the productions. Since the demand for Togolese hip hop music has increased, businessmen found a good way to make profit by facilitating artists to access the infrastructures they need.

Togo Hip Hop Award 
Togolese authorities and the minister of culture have not considered Togolese hip hop music as music with a proper cultural identity. But to reward Togolese hip hop artists, authorities established since 2003 a night each year to give them awards, called Togo Hip Hop Awards. Togo Hip Hop Awards festival is an occasion to gather all the Togolese hip hop artists from the North to the South and even those who are abroad. These Awards are considered to reinforce the cooperation and relations among the hip hop artists.

Social impact

Social impact on teenagers 
Togolese hip hop has the ability to bring political, social, and economic issues in the society by opening people’s eyes on what is really going on in the country. As it can affect both young and old people, Togolese Hip Hop has both positive and negative aspects on the society and teenagers in particular. Hip hop is no more only a music but has extended to clothing as street fashion, break dance, graffiti, MCing, and DJing.in another way in rap we have some togolese-rap like Elom 20ce who bring the history of the country and education,we have immortal Adze who educate the youth about the evil of the gettho( the using of drugs and acohool), all this is showing the level of investigation in the rap.

Change in their lifestyle 
Teenagers have their own hip hop communities governed by talented designers who impose the hip hop style in the cities. The two main designers are EFA DK who is Orcyno’s brother and personal designer and WELFON. EFA DK created a sports wear universe since 1999 added by a special Togolese touch with traditional clothing. WELFON is more based on maintaining the unity with the idea he got in 2005 to mark T-shirts and caps with a Togolese flag design. Despite this maturity of Togolese youth toward the conscience of a united country for a better development, they nevertheless adopted a semblance of American hip hop stars’ lives. Some Togolese hip hop artists try to copy what is called the “thug life” of certain American hip hop stars. Girls, alcohol, parties, cars, and expensive clothes constitute their environment. They usually do this in order to show their power. However, it is thought that by doing that, these artists are degrading their image and giving a bad example to youth.

Birth of national unity 
For a long time, football has been the only social relaxation activity that got together the Togolese youth. During the late 1980s football has been replaced by Togolese hip hop music which seems to be playing the same role. Togolese hip hop helped patriotism to be developed among teenagers and unify them without any consideration of political party or region. Natural borders have disappeared and music is the link between the young generations. This national unity of the Togolese youth ensures the future development of Togo in a peaceful atmosphere. Togolese hip hop keeps youths unified and struggle for national reconciliation. That is why festival, shows, concerts are always organised to let youth express themselves and entertain them the same time.

Media 
The media seems very supportive of Togolese hip hop music and help artists a lot with their promotions. A lot of TV shows have been devoted to Togolese hip hop music. Presentations of new albums are frequently broadcast on television but radios are still very important for the development of Togolese hip hop music (underground and popular).

Notable artists
Artists who perform either the soft or the hard variety of hip hop:

Orcyno
Iras
Eric MC
Pitt toxiko (a.k.a. Busta Pitt)
Komi Ninja (EL-DHECK)
Ali Jezz
Small poppy
M Tall T
Djanta Kan 
Rx Patou
Immortal adze
Hodada
Toofan

References

External links
 Iras World
 
 
 
 Orcyno Facebook
 
 
 

Togolese music
Hip hop by country
African hip hop